is a feminine Japanese given name that can be written with various kanji.

Possible writings
Haruhi can be written using different kanji characters and can mean:
 春日, "spring day"
 晴日, "clear day"
 春陽, "spring sunshine"
 春妃, "spring princess"
 春姫, "spring princess"
 遙日, "distant day"
The name can also be written in hiragana or katakana.

People
 , a member of the rock band Doremidan
 , a Japanese singer-songwriter
 , a Japanese professional wrestler
 , a Japanese voice actress

Fictional characters
 , a character from the Global Garden manga series
 , the main character of the Ouran High School Host Club series
 , a character from the film The Angel's Egg
 , a character from the W Wish series
 , a character from the Happiness! series
 , the title character of the Haruhi Suzumiya franchise
 , a character from the B-Project series

See also
 Haruhi, Aichi, a former town in Nishikasugai District, Aichi, Japan
 Kasuga (disambiguation), which can be written with the same kanji as Haruhi (春日 Haruhi)

External links
Haruhi at Denshi Jisho, showing a variety of ways to render 'Haruhi' in different kanji

Japanese feminine given names